Lamutskoye is a rural locality (a selo) in Anadyrsky District of Chukotka Autonomous Okrug, Russia, located northwest of Markovo and  northeast of Chuvanskoye on the middle reaches of the Anadyr River. As of the 2010 Census, its population was 173.

Name and geography
The name of Lamutskoye is derived from the word Lamut—an archaic name for the Evens (the dominant indigenous people in the area who migrated to western Chukotka from what is now the Sakha Republic of Russia). It stands in the upper reaches of the Anadyr River, near the mouth of the Bolshoy Peledon River.

History
Founded in 1936 (or, according to other sources, in 1940) as a collective farm, Lamutskoye served as a central hub for the Lamutsko-Yablonskaya nomadic reindeer breeders group, consisting of only eight itinerant families. In 1960, along with Chuvanskoye and Markovo, the farm was merged to form the Markovsky State Farm.

After the dissolution of the Soviet Union in 1991, small localities like Lamutskoye were extremely hard hit. In 2000, the monthly living wage across Chukotka was estimated at 3,800 rubles; however, the average wage in Lamutskoye was a meager 50–100 rubles.

Administrative and municipal status
Within the framework of administrative divisions, Lamutskoye is subordinated to Anadyrsky District. Within the framework of municipal divisions, Lamutskoye is a part of Lamutskoye Rural Settlement within Anadyrsky Municipal District.

Culture and infrastructure
Lamutskoye is the starting point for the Ryilet festivities—the longest reindeer race in the world held each year over a  course between Lamutskoye and Chuvanskoye—in which racers compete for the Governor's Cup.

Lamutskoye's infrastructure consists of a school, library, and the Palace of Culture, which conducts traditional feasts, races, and ceremonies connected with the reindeer herders.

Demographics
As of 2010, the official census results showed a population of 173, of whom 98 were male and 75 female—a significant reduction from the 2006 estimate of 230 and the 2005 estimate of 213 (according to a report prepared for the Kupol gold project,). Of the 213 people living here in 2005, 212 were of indigenous origin. The ethnic composition of Lamutskoye's population is as follows:

Climate
Lamutskoye has a continental subarctic climate (Köppen climate classification Dfc) with bitterly cold, very long winters and short, very mild summers.

See also
List of inhabited localities in Anadyrsky District

References

Notes

Sources
 
 
E. Chereshev and A. Shestakov. Anadyr River Watershed, Rapid Assessment Report. Institute of biological Problems of the North, Wild Salmon Center, June 2003.
W. K. Dallmann. Indigenous Peoples of the north of the Russian Federation, Map 3.6, Chukotskiy Avtonomyy Okrug. 1997.
Bema Gold Corporation. Environmental Impact Assessment, Kupol Gold Project, Far East Russia, June 2005.

M. Strogoff, P.-C. Brochet, and D. Auzias. Petit Futé: Chukotka. "Avant-Garde" Publishing House, 2006.

External links
Photo of Lamutskoye

Rural localities in Chukotka Autonomous Okrug